Fuck You/ A Magazine of the Arts was a literary magazine founded in 1962 by the poet Ed Sanders  on the Lower East Side of New York City. Sanders later co-founded the musical group the Fugs. Sanders produced thirteen issues of Fuck You/ A Magazine of the Arts from 1962 to 1965.

The credo for the magazine, originated by Sanders, was I'll print anything. Its first issue contained the following dedication: "Dedicated to Pacifism, Unilateral Disarmament, National Defense thru Nonviolent Resistence [sic], Multilateral Indiscriminate Apertural Conjugation, Anarchism, World Federalism, Civil Disobedience, Obstructers & Submarine Boarders, and All Those Groped by J. Edgar Hoover in the Silent Halls of Congress."

Fuck You/ A Magazine of the Arts was produced on a mimeograph and printed on multi-colored construction paper.

Legacy
Fuck You/ A Magazine of the Arts was a core publication in the Mimeo Revolution. It was dedicated to free expression, and especially defying the taboos around sex and drugs, advocating free love promiscuity and the use of psychedelics long before those were picked up by the more widespread countercultural movements of the late Sixties. Ed Sanders and his collaborators served as a bridge between the Beat generation of the Fifties and the later Hippie counterculture of the mid Sixties.

List of issues
Number 1 (Feb/April 1962)
Number 2 (May 1962)
Number 3 (June 1962)
Number 4 (August 1962)
Number 5, Volume 1 (Dec 1962)
Number 5, Volume 2 (Dec 1962)
Number 5, Volume 3 (May 1963)
Number 5, Volume 4 (??? 1963)
Number 5, Volume 5 (Dec 1963)
Number 5, Volume 6 (April/May 1964)
Number 5, Volume 7 (Sept 1964)
Number 5, Volume 8 (1965)—Mad Motherfucker Issue (Andy Warhol cover)
Number 5, Volume 9 (June 1965)

Participants
Issues included works by:

Antonin Artaud
W. H. Auden
Julian Beck
Ted Berrigan
Joe Brainard
William S. Burroughs
Gregory Corso
Robert Creeley
Diane DiPrima
Allen Ginsberg
Herbert Huncke
Leroi Jones
Tuli Kupferberg
Norman Mailer
Michael McClure
Charles Olson
Frank O'Hara
Peter Orlovsky
Gary Snyder
Andy Warhol
Philip Whalen

References
Notes

Bibliography
Fuck You web archive
Life Magazine (February 17, 1967).
Charters, Ann (ed.). The Portable Beat Reader. New York: Penguin Books, 1992.  (hc);  (pbk).
Sanders, Ed. Fug You: An Informal History of the Peace Eye Bookstore, the Fuck You Press, the Fugs, and Counterculture in the Lower East Side, Da Capo Press, 2011

External links
Archive of Fuck You: A Magazine of the Arts at Ubuweb
Fuck You: A Magazine of the Arts at Verdant Press
Fuck You: A Magazine of the Arts library holdings in WorldCat

1962 establishments in New York City
1965 disestablishments in New York (state)
American art
Visual arts magazines published in the United States
Poetry magazines published in the United States
Defunct literary magazines published in the United States
Lower East Side
Magazines published in New York City
Magazines established in 1962
Magazines disestablished in 1965